Anne Grunow is a senior research scientist at Ohio State University in the Byrd Polar Research Center. She is also the current director of the Polar Rock Repository. Grunow is a geologist specializing in Antarctic tectonics, with her research using methods from geochronology and paleomagnetism.

Early life and education 

During her undergraduate years at Wellesley College, Grunow developed a love of geology. Her attachment to the outdoors comes from her childhood when she lived on a farm. This aligned well with the extensive fieldwork that a geology degree required. Grunow graduated from Wellesley College in 1981. She then continued her education at Columbia University in New York City which marked the beginning of her travels to Antarctica in 1983.  Grunow was the first woman to visit many of the remote West Antarctic outcrops in the Ellworth-Whitmore mountains, Thurston Island/Jones Mtns and Pine Island Bay.  In 1989 she received her Doctorate (PhD)  in Geology. Grunow worked under advisors Ian W.D. Dalziel and Dennis V. Kent on her dissertation entitled: Aspects of the evolution of the West Antarctic margin of Gondwanaland.

Following this, Grunow received a NATO Post Doctoral Fellowship from 1991 to 1993 at the University of Oxford. She later worked with Terry Wilson and Richard E. Hanson on the research paper: Gondwana assembly: The View from Southern Africa and East Gondwana. Their work was published in the Journal of Geodynamics in 1997.

Career and research 
In 1989, she started as a university postdoctoral fellow and then research scientist at Ohio State University in the Byrd Polar Research Center. Now a senior research scientist at Ohio State, she is also the director of the Polar Rock Repository. Her expertise includes geology and earth science, geochronology, tectonics, paleomagnetism, and polar geology. Her research centers on Antarctic Tectonics and she has led research teams to the Antarctic Peninsula and the Transantartic Mountains.

Some of Anne Grunow's most cited and notable work includes her research on Pan-African deformation and the potential links to the lapetus opening. This research centered around data collections dating back to the late Neoproterozoic era, and how they demonstrated a temporal correlation between Pan-African deformation and the Iapetus ocean basin closing. Another one of Grunow's most cited research paper was on the changing magmatic and tectonic styles along the paleo‐Pacific margin of Gondwana and the onset of early Paleozoic magmatism in Antarctica. This research focused on the early Cambrian Period tectonics  and its association with volcanic arc magmatism .

Her research has also been implemented in the Global Change Master Directory and published in Journal of Geophysical Research.

Her work was noted by the United States Antarctic Program, which commented on the benefit of her work and the Polar Rock Repository's ability to provide samples from Antarctica to a variety of scientific sources for study.

Grunow was also active in tectonics research of the Avalon Terrane in New England with Wellesley College mentor, Margaret Thompson.  They have published many articles on the Boston Basin and it's evolution in the late Neoproterozoic to early Cambrian. She also conducted research on  Neoproterozoic rocks near Corumba, Brazil and Puerto Suarez, Bolivia.  Results from this work with colleague Loren Babcock have been published.

Publications 
 New paleomagnetic data from the Antarctic Peninsula and their tectonic implications
 The implications for Gondwana of new Ordovician paleomagnetic data from igneous rocks in southern Victoria Land, East Antarctica
Pan-African deformation and the potential links to the lapetus opening
 The changing magmatic and tectonic styles along the paleo‐Pacific margin of Gondwana and the onset of early Paleozoic magmatism in Antarctica 
 Gondwana assembly: The view from Southern Africa and East Gondwana
 Magnetic Data from Subglacial Clasts, West Antarctic Ice Sheet

Awards and honors 
 Fellow of the Geological Society of America 
 Chairman of the SCAR Antarctic Expert Group on Antarctic Geological Heritage and Geoconservation
 Nominated to the U.S Board on Geographic Names  
 Antarctic peak named after her (Grunow Peak)
 Antarctic Service Medal

References 

Living people
Year of birth missing (living people)
Scientists from New Jersey
Absegami High School alumni
People from Galloway Township, New Jersey
Wellesley College alumni
Columbia University alumni
20th-century American geologists
21st-century American geologists
American women geologists
Ohio State University staff
Fellows of the Geological Society of America
20th-century American women scientists
21st-century American women scientists